Sir James Michael Yorrick Oliver (born 13 July 1940) is a retired investment banker who was Lord Mayor of London for 2001–02.

Educated at Wellington College, he started his working life in Stockbrokers Kitcat & Aitken and became a member of the London Stock Exchange. He subsequently became both a partner of the firm and later Managing Director. City mergers in the 1990s saw him become Director, Lloyds Investment Managers and then Director, Investment Funds at Hill Samuel Asset Management. In July 2000, following the Lloyds TSB merger with Scottish Widows, he became Director, Investment Funds with Scottish Widows Investment Partnership. Sir Michael has also served on the Boards of a number of investment trusts and country funds. He is a fellow of the Securities Institute.

Parallel to his business success he has also been a Magistrate, a Liveryman (Past Master of the Worshipful Company of Ironmongers), and an Alderman. He was an Aldermanic Sheriff in 1997 and elected Lord Mayor in 2001.

Sir Michael is married to Sally and has two children Sophie and Justine and four grandchildren. His interests include travel and archaeology.

References
 Alderman Sir Michael Oliver. Debrett's. Accessed 2011-01-17.

1940 births
Living people
People educated at Wellington College, Berkshire
Knights Bachelor
Knights of Justice of the Order of St John
Councilmen and Aldermen of the City of London
Sheriffs of the City of London
21st-century lord mayors of London
21st-century British politicians
20th-century British politicians
Masters of the Worshipful Company of Ironmongers